Nanga Linsum is a settlement in Sarawak, Malaysia. Neighbouring settlements include:
Bagumbang  southwes

References

Populated places in Sarawak